Foel Goch may refer to:
Foel Goch (Arenigs), a 611m mountain in north-east Wales
Foel Goch (Hirnant), a 613m subsidiary summit of Esgeiriau Gwynion
Foel-goch, a mountain in Snowdonia, north-west Wales